Esmail Khan (also Romanized as Esmā‘īl Khān; also known as Esmāʿīlābād) is a village in Gol Banu Rural District, Pain Jam District, Torbat-e Jam County, Razavi Khorasan Province, Iran. At the 2006 census, its population was 539, in 113 families.

References 

Populated places in Torbat-e Jam County